The 2018 National Premier Leagues Victoria was the fifth season of the National Premier Leagues Victoria, the top league in Victorian football. Bentleigh Greens were the defending champions, having won their second championship title the previous season.

Teams
Fourteen teams competed in the league – the top twelve teams from previous season and the two teams promoted from the NPL Victoria 2. The promoted teams were Dandenong Thunder from the Eastern conference and Northcote City from the Western conference. They replaced North Geelong Warriors and St Albans Saints.

Stadiums and locations

Note: Table lists in alphabetical order.

League table

Results

Finals series

Elimination-finals

Semi-finals

Grand Final

Season statistics

Scoring

Top scorers

Discipline

Player 
 Most yellow cards: 8
  Blair Govan (Hume City)
  Joey Katebian (Avondale)
  Tomislav Uskok (Melbourne Knights)
  Reuben Way (Heidelberg United)

 Most red cards: 2
  Darby Dexter (Hume City)
  Lewis Hall (Heidelberg United)
  Shaun Timmins (Melbourne Knights)

References

External links
 Official website

2018 in Australian soccer